Mattia Desole (born 10 May 1993), sometimes spelled De Sole, is a Swiss professional footballer who plays as a left-back. He is the step-brother of fellow footballers Frank and Rolf Feltscher.

Club career
Born in Zürich, Switzerland, Desole moved to Italian club Inter Milan in 2008 playing two seasons for its U17 team. In 2010, he moved to cross-town rival A.C. Milan, for its U20 reserve. In 2012, the league committee changed the age limit of the reserve to U19, and Desole left Milan for nearby Lombard club A.C. Monza Brianza 1912 on loan. During the January transfer window he joined Foligno on another loan spell. The following season, he moved back to his native Switzerland, joining Chiasso on another loan.

International career
Desole was a member of Swiss national youth teams from 2008 to 2012. Desole is eligible to represent Switzerland or Italy as he also holds an Italian passport.

Personal life
He is the step-brother of Frank and Rolf Feltscher. Zaida (nee Martínez) Feltscher divorced in 2001 and remarried Paolo Desole, Mattia's father. Mattia has another biological sibling, Paolo's first son Davide.

References

1993 births
Living people
Footballers from Zürich
Swiss people of Italian descent
Swiss men's footballers
Swiss expatriate footballers
Swiss expatriate sportspeople in Italy
Expatriate footballers in Italy
Association football fullbacks
Grasshopper Club Zürich players
Inter Milan players
A.C. Milan players
A.C. Monza players
A.S.D. Città di Foligno 1928 players
FC Chiasso players
FC Rapperswil-Jona players